DRX may refer to:

 Desktop Replacement Extreme, a laptop made by Falcon Northwest
 Discontinuous reception, a method in mobile communication
 DRX (esports), professional South Korean esports organization
 Dynamic recrystallisation, a metallurgical phenomenon
 Proposed pressurized water reactor for submarine propulsion developed by the Japan Atomic Energy Research Institute (JAERI)